Ante Toni Žižić (born 4 January 1997) is a Croatian professional basketball player for Anadolu Efes of the Turkish Basketball Super League (BSL) and the Euroleague. He was selected 23rd overall by the Boston Celtics in the 2016 NBA draft.

Professional career

Kaštela (2013–2014)
Žižić's first team was KK Split, in the 2013–14 season, but he played for their junior team, in which he only played in 3 games. He then moved to the Cedevita Zagreb's junior team, and with them he played in 5 games.

Gorica (2014)
To start the 2014–15 season, Žižić played for Gorica.

Cibona (2014–2016)
Žižiće moved to Cibona Zagreb for the rest of the season. In that year, he averaged 7.4 points, 0.3 assists, 0.3 steals, and 0.9 blocks, in 15.5 minutes per game, in 25 games played in the Adriatic League. His breakout season was in the 2015–16 season.

He was named the 2015–16 ABA League season's Top Prospect. In that season, he averaged 12.7 points, 7.2 rebounds, and 1.2 blocks in 24.8 minutes per game, in 26 games played in the Adriatic League. He was also named to the European-wide 3rd-tier level FIBA Europe Cup's Starting Five Team of the 2015–16 season.

On 11 October 2016, Žižić was named the MVP of the fourth week of the 2016–17 ABA League season. After he scored 37 points and grabbed 20 rebounds, in Cibona's win against MZT Skopje Aerodrom, by the final score of 89–85, in a game that was decided after two overtimes.

Darüşşafaka (2016–2017)
On 27 December 2016, Žižić left Cibona, and signed with the Turkish team Darüşşafaka Doğuş, of the Turkish Super League.

With Darüşşafaka, Žižić made his debut in the European top-tier level, the EuroLeague, on 30 December 2016, in an 81–77 road loss against FC Barcelona. In his first EuroLeague game, Žižić had 4 points, 6 rebounds, 2 steals, and 2 blocks.

Cleveland Cavaliers (2017–2020)
Žižić was selected with the 23rd overall pick in the 2016 NBA draft, by the Boston Celtics.

On 1 July 2017, Žižić signed with the Boston Celtics. Before even suiting up for a single regular-season game for the Celtics, Žižić was traded to the Cleveland Cavaliers alongside Isaiah Thomas, Jae Crowder, and the Brooklyn Nets' unprotected 2018 first-round pick for Kyrie Irving on 22 August 2017. However, eight days after the trade was first confirmed, the Celtics would also add a 2020 second-round pick from the Miami Heat in order to fully complete the deal to satisfy Cleveland's worries involving Isaiah Thomas' hip injury.

Žižić spent time with the Canton Charge during his rookie season. On 11 March, he scored 15 points and recorded 7 rebounds (both career-highs) in a loss to Los Angeles Lakers. In the last game of the regular season, he scored 20 points and recorded 7 rebounds. The Cavaliers made it to the 2018 NBA Finals, but lost the series 4-0 to the Golden State Warriors.

Maccabi Tel Aviv (2020–2022)
On 25 August 2020, Žižić signed a two-year deal with Israeli team Maccabi Tel Aviv. In 2020-21, he led the league with a .699 field goal percentage, and was 10th in the Euroleague with 0.8 blocks per game.

On 9 May 2022, during a game against Hapoel Haifa, Žižić lost consciousness after hitting his head on the ground. He was rushed to a hospital and regained consciousness later that night.

On 21 June 2022, Žižić officially parted ways with the Israeli club after two seasons.

Anadolu Efes (2022–present)
On 22 June 2022, Žižić signed a three-year (2+1) contract with Turkish club Anadolu Efes, the reigning back-to-back EuroLeague champions.

National team career
Žižić played with the junior national teams of Croatia. With Croatia's junior national teams, he played at the 2013 FIBA Europe Under-16 Championship, the 2014 FIBA Europe Under-18 Championship, where he won a bronze medal, and at the	2015 FIBA Under-19 World Championship, where he won a silver medal.

Personal life

Žižić's older brother, Andrija, was also a professional basketball player. The two brothers were teammates at Cibona Zagreb, in the 2015–16 season. His older brother played in 107 EuroLeague games, with Cibona Zagreb, FC Barcelona, Olympiacos, and Panathinaikos, and he also won a EuroLeague championship with Maccabi Tel Aviv.

Career statistics

NBA

Regular season

|-
| style="text-align:left;"| 
| style="text-align:left;"| Cleveland
| 32 || 2 || 6.7 || .731 || – || .724 || 1.9 || .2 || .1 || .4 || 3.7
|-
| style="text-align:left;"| 
| style="text-align:left;"| Cleveland
| 59 || 25 || 18.3 || .553 || – || .705 || 5.4 || .9 || .2 || .4 || 7.8
|-
| style="text-align:left;"| 
| style="text-align:left;"| Cleveland
| 22 || 0 || 10.0 || .569 || – || .737 || 3.0 || .3 || .3 || .2 || 4.4
|- class="sortbottom"
| style="text-align:center;" colspan="2"| Career
| 113 || 27 || 13.4 || .581 || – || .711 || 3.9  || .6 || .2 || .4 || 6.0

Playoffs

|-
| style="text-align:left;"| 2018
| style="text-align:left;"| Cleveland
| 8 || 0 || 2.9 || .500 || - || .500 || .8 || .1 || .0 || .1 || 1.6
|- class="sortbottom"
| style="text-align:center;" colspan="2"| Career
| 8 || 0 || 2.9 || .500 || - || .500 || .8 || .1 || .0 || .1 || 1.6

EuroLeague

|-
| style="text-align:left;"| 2016–17
| style="text-align:left;"| Darüşşafaka
| 20 || 17 || 21.9 || .649 || .000 || .643 || 6.7 || .4 || .2 || .8 || 9.0 || 13.3
|-
| style="text-align:left;"| 2020–21
| style="text-align:left;"| Maccabi
| 34 || 30 || 19.5 || .589 || .000 || .771 || 5.4 || .7 || .4 || .8 || 9.1 || 11.4

See also

 List of European basketball players in the United States

References

External links

 
 Ante Žižić at aba-liga.com
 Ante Žižić at euroleague.net
 
 Ante Žižić at FIBA Europe
 Ante Žižić at draftexpress.com
 
 Ante Žižić at tblstat.net

1997 births
Living people
ABA League players
Anadolu Efes S.K. players
Basketball players from Split, Croatia
Boston Celtics draft picks
Canton Charge players
Centers (basketball)
Cleveland Cavaliers players
Croatian expatriate basketball people in Israel
Croatian expatriate basketball people in Turkey
Croatian expatriate basketball people in the United States
Croatian men's basketball players
Darüşşafaka Basketbol players
KK Cibona players
KK Gorica players
KK Kaštela players
KK Split players
Maccabi Tel Aviv B.C. players
National Basketball Association players from Croatia